Euthanasia is the practice of intentionally ending a life in order to relieve pain and suffering, while assisted suicide, also known as physician-assisted suicide, is suicide committed with the aid of a physician. Assisted suicide is often confused with euthanasia. In cases of euthanasia the physician administers the means of death, usually a lethal drug. In assisted suicide, it is required that the person voluntarily expresses their wish to die, and also makes a request for medication for the purpose of ending their life. Assisted suicide thus involves a person’s self-administration of deadly drugs that are supplied by a doctor.

The legality of euthanasia and assisted suicide varies. Non-voluntary euthanasia (patient's consent unavailable) and involuntary euthanasia is illegal in all countries. Voluntary euthanasia is legal in Belgium, Canada, Colombia, Luxembourg, the Netherlands, New Zealand and Spain, and was previously legal in the Northern Territory. It is also legal in all Australian states, and in the US jurisdictions of California, Colorado, Hawaii, Maine, Montana, New Jersey, Oregon, Vermont, Washington and Washington DC. Assisted suicide is legal in Austria, Belgium, Canada, Luxembourg, the Netherlands, New Zealand, Spain and Switzerland.

This list contains notable people who have died via either legal voluntary euthanasia or assisted suicide. The criterion for notability is an article on the individual in the English Wikipedia.

References

Euthanasia
Assisted suicide
Euthanasia